Larry Seidlin (born May 24, 1950, in the Bronx, New York) was a State Court judge for the Circuit Court of the Seventeenth Judicial Circuit of the State of Florida in and for Broward County. He was the presiding judge during the infamous Anna Nicole Smith body custody hearing after her death. Among  other institutions  Seidlin  received  his  education  at  Hunter College.

Personal  life
Seidlin is Jewish. He is  married to Belinda  Ray Seidlin;  they  have   one  young daughter.

Anna Nicole Smith trial

As judge during the Anna Nicole Smith body custody hearing, Judge Seidlin made one-liners and other attempts at humor which some who know him said was normal for him, but led to speculation that his actions and comments were for the cameras in the courtroom and were made as an attempt to secure a courtroom television show similar to Judge Judy's. The judgment was given in what some have viewed as an overly theatrical style, with the Judge weeping and fumbling his words, though others close to him have said that his courtroom conduct was genuine  South Florida lawyers advise that Seidlin has always been a bit of a comical judge. His courtroom antics serve to relax the participants in the process.

Seidlin came under criticism in the legal community for his handling of the case, and later came under fire for other behavior. In February 2007, WSVN-TV Channel 7 reported Seidlin took three-hour lunch breaks on the four days in April that he was tailed by the station's investigative team. WSVN also showed that he was at a tennis club by 4 p.m. on three of the four days he was watched. He declined to comment for the TV report.

Resignation and rumored television show ambitions
Seidlin retired from the bench in summer 2007. His alleged intentions to star in a courtroom TV show were reported by the celebrity gossip website TMZ.com, citing "unidentified sources" as early as February 20, 2007.
In a letter to Florida Governor Charlie Crist in June 2007, Seidlin wrote:

"It is now time for me to devote more of my daily life to my own young family and to pursue the many opportunities that have been offered to me outside the judicial system and I have disregarded until now...While these opportunities are varied, they all share in common a further commitment to helping my fellow citizens through roles in the educational system, the media and nonprofit organizations."

Seidlin has not given specifics on his plans after his resignation, but according to Broadcasting & Cable magazine, Seidlin had allegedly cut a deal with CBS Television Distribution (CTD) to develop a court show in fall 2008, but no official confirmation has been made from either party. CBS Paramount will allegedly produce Seidlin's pilot for CTD; they also handle Judy Sheindlin's Judge Judy show.

On Saturday Night Live sketches during the Smith case, Larry Seidlin was portrayed by Fred Armisen.

Corruption controversy
Seidlin was criminally investigated for "allegedly asking a lawyer for gifts and financially exploiting an elderly woman." In  February 2007, former Florida attorney Jack Thompson of Coral Gables, Florida filed  a formal complaint against Seidlin to Judicial Qualifications Commission for "violating almost every judicial canon." The complaint was based on an investigative report in a local weekly newspaper that reported that the judge had received questionable gifts and large sums of money from Barbara Kasler, an elderly neighbor in his Fort Lauderdale condo building. After an investigation by the Miami-Dade State Attorney's Office, Seidlin was cleared of any wrongdoing in January 2009.

Elder-abuse lawsuit and settlement

In March 2009, the niece Corine Kasler and caretaker of the  elderly widow Barbara M. Kasler (83),  filed another complaint with the Elder Abuse Hotline in Florida, reiterating their belief that Seidlin had manipulated the woman who suffered memory lapses into giving him money and had failed to adequately care for her. Corine Kasler and the caregiver had managed to remove Seidlin's wife Belinda and their daughter from Barbara Kasler's Will. The new Will  was drafted excluding the Seidlin family members.  They also  accused Larry  Seidlin and his family of doing horrible things to Mrs. Kasler - including "failing to feed  and medicate her"  and  endangering her health with poor care. The suit also accused Seidlin's in-laws Oren and Barbara Ray of buying a condo from Mrs. Kasler at an unfair discount. Barbara Kasler died on November 27, 2010, at age 84. 
The family of the Mrs. Barbara Kasler and the Seidlin family reached a settlement in  October 2011.  Seidlin, his wife and his in-laws lived in the same condo building as Kasler whose wealth was estimated a $5 million, according to the lawsuit. The confidential settlement was signed  by Larry  Seidlin, his wife  Belinda,   his  in-laws and the Kasler family. Mrs. Kasler  allegedly gave the Seidlin family $500,000 in gifts and cash.

References

Living people
1950 births
Hunter College alumni
Florida state court judges
20th-century American Jews
People from the Bronx
21st-century American Jews